The 1890–91 season was Newton Heath's second season in the Football Alliance; they finished in 9th position. The club also took part in the FA Cup, reaching the Second Qualifying Round; the Lancashire Senior Cup, in which they reached the Second Round; and the Manchester and District Challenge Cup, in which they finished as runners-up to Ardwick.

Football Alliance

FA Cup

Lancashire Senior Cup

Manchester Senior Cup

References

Manchester United F.C. seasons
Newton Heath LYR